The 17th Lithuanian Uhlan Regiment was an uhlan regiment of the Grande Armée during the Napoleonic Wars.

Formation 

On 5 July 1812, Count Michał Tyszkiewicz began forming the 17th Lithuanian Uhlan Regiment on his own initiative and with his own funds. The men who joined the regiment came from the towns of Biržai, Raseiniai, Telšiai, Panevėžys and their respective surroundings. The regimental headquarters were in Kupiškis. Napoleon appointed Count Michał Tyszkiewicz as the regiment's commander and awarded him the rank of colonel.

Napoleon's retreat 
At the end of 1812, together with other Lithuanian units, this regiment covered the Grande Armée's retreat and joined the X Corps. In December 1812 , the 17th Uhlan Regiment retreated through Tauragė to Königsberg. On 19 January 1813, the regiment had 829 uhlans and was stationing in Elbing. Later it was moved to Wielkopolska and was stationing in Skiwerzyna and Międzychód, when it joined the remnants of the French army commanded by the Viceroy Eugène de Beauharnais. On February 4, it fought near Brandenburg. On February 11 or 12, the 17th Uhlan regiment fought together with the 19th Lithuanian Uhlan Regiment near Sieraków. There it was surprised and defeated by General Chernyshev's Russian vanguard. The general Prince Romualdas Giedraitis, who commanded both Uhlan regiments, was taken prisoner. He was wounded during his capture. During the battle, the regiment lost 147 out of 585 men it had before.

War of the Sixth Coalition 
After this battle, both regiments were attached to the division of the French General Gérard, belonging to the XIII Corps. Together with it, the regiment fought near Bremen, Hamburg, Lübeck. On 20 April 1813, men from the 19th regiment were drafted into the regiment, after 225 soldiers from the 19th regiment were selected for the Imperial Guard. And the former commander of the 19th regiment col. Konstanty Rajecki became the new commander of the 17th regiment. The regiment fought its last battles in Denmark. After the abdication of Emperor Napoleon with the Treaty of Fontainebleau, the regiment was allowed to return to its homeland with weapons and flags.

Citations

Cited sources and other sources 

La Grande Armée